Torre Núñez y Navarro (also Repsol building) is a skyscraper in Barcelona, Catalonia, Spain. Completed in 1993, it has 20 floors and rises 77 meters. It lies on Carrer de Tarragona street 141, near Plaça d'Espanya and three other skyscrapers: Edificio Allianz, Hotel Torre Catalunya, Edificio Tarragona.

See also 

 List of tallest buildings and structures in Barcelona

References 

Skyscraper office buildings in Barcelona
Art museums established in 1993